Polyhymno cemiostomella is a moth of the family Gelechiidae. It was described by Zeller in 1877. It is found on Zanzibar.

References

Moths described in 1877
Polyhymno